Dmitry Ilyin (born 1984) is a Russian fine art and documentary street photographer.

Biography
Ilyin was born in Leningrad, USSR. He lives and works in Podolsk since 1985.

Ilyin has been creating artistic photography since 2009. He is known primarily for his work, made in the genre of art street life photography.
In 2010 he joined the Russian photo club "50mm". Since 2011, Ilyin is one of the head of the photo club.

Group exhibitions
 2015 Best of Russia 2014, Moscow Contemporary Art Center Winzavod, Moscow
 2015 Visible Features Of The Era, Foundation for historical photography named after Karl Bulla, Saint Petersburg
 2016 Best of Russia 2015, Moscow Contemporary Art Center Winzavod, Moscow
 2016 5th Festival of street photography, Center of documentary photography "FOTODOC", Moscow
 2016 7th International Festival of Photography "Volga Biennale", The Russian Museum of Photography, Nizhny Novgorod,
 2016 11th annual photo exhibition "The city - Habitat", The Exhibition Hall book and graphic centre, Saint Petersburg
 2016 Sony World Photography Awards Exhibition 2016, Somerset House, London
 2016 16th China International Photographic Art Exhibition, Shengda Art Museum, Zhengzhou, China
 2016 Planet Moscow - 2016, VDNKh, Moscow
 2017 3rd International Salon of reporter photography "LifePressPhoto - 2017", National University "Ostroh Academy", Ostroh, Ukraine
 2017 12th annual photo exhibition "The city - Habitat", The Exhibition Hall book and graphic centre, Saint Petersburg
 2017 18th International Architecture & Urban Digital Competition, Busan Art Center, Busan, South Korea
 2018 Young photographers of Russia - 2018, Russian State Library for Young Adults, Moscow, Russia

Publications
 "Best of Russia - 2014", book, Russia, 
 "Best of Russia - 2015", book, Russia, 
 "Planet Moscow - 2016", catalogue, Russia
 "The city - Habitat, 2016", catalogue, Russia
 "Works of 16th China international photographic art exhibition", catalogue, China, 
 "The city - Habitat, 2017", catalogue, Russia

References

External links

1984 births
Living people
People from Podolsk
Russian photographers
Fine art photographers
Street photographers